= Yiting Li =

Yiting Li is an economist.

== Career ==
They are a Distinguished Professor at National Taiwan University.

In 2022 they were elected to the Academia Sinica.
